Trengganua sibylla is a cicada species from Southeast Asia, and the sole member of the genus Trengganua. The species is recorded from Terengganu, Jelebu and Temengor Forest Reserve in Peninsular Malaysia. Trengganua sibylla typically sings around high noon.

References

External links
Song of Trengganua sibylla
A pair of Trengganua sibylla mating

Gaeanini
Insects described in 1863
Fauna of Malaysia